Pierre Coustillas (11 July 1930 – 11 August 2018) was a French literary scholar and emeritus professor of English at the University of Lille. He was a specialist in the work of George Gissing.

Selected publications
 Gissing's writings on Dickens : a bio-bibliographical survey. Enitharmon Press, London, 1971.
 The rediscovery of George Gissing. London, 1971. (With John Spiers)
 London and the life of literature in late Victorian England: The diary of George Gissing, novelist. Harvester Press, 1978. 
 The heroic life of George Gissing. Pickering & Chatto, London, 2011-2012. (3 volumes)
 George Gissing: The critical heritage.  Routledge, London, 2013. (Joint editor with Colin Partridge)

References 

1930 births
2018 deaths
Academic staff of the Lille University of Science and Technology
English literature academics